Schönborn is a municipality in the district of Rhein-Lahn, in Rhineland-Palatinate, in western Germany. It belongs to the association community of Aar-Einrich.

Schönborn is the origin of the Counts of Schönborn. Between 1100 and 1479, the lords were vassals of the Counts of Katzenelnbogen whose castle at Katzenelnbogen was three miles away. Today a little house next to the church is still called Schönborner Hof.

Notes and references

Municipalities in Rhineland-Palatinate
Rhein-Lahn-Kreis